The 2015 Chatham Cup is New Zealand's 88th annual knockout football competition.

The 2015 competition had a preliminary round, a qualification round, and four rounds proper before quarter-finals, semi-finals, and a final. In total, 125 teams took part in the 2015 competition, two fewer than the 2014 Chatham Cup.

Round and dates

The 2015 final

The Final of the 2015 Chatham Cup was held between Eastern Suburbs and Napier City Rovers on Sunday, 20 September 2015 at The Trusts Arena, Waitakere City.

Eastern Suburbs won the match 2–1 after extra time.

It was the sixth time Eastern Suburbs AFC had won the Chatham Cup.

Results

Preliminary round

Round 1

Round 2

New Entries:

 Central United
 Eastern Suburbs
 Birkenhead United AFC
 Western Suburbs
 Napier City Rovers
 Three Kings United
 East Coast Bays AFC
 Onehunga Sports
 Melville United
 Ferrymead Bays Football
 Palmerston North Marist
 Bay Olympic
 Glenfield Rovers
 Waitakere City FC
 Hamilton Wanderers FC
 Western Springs AFC
 Stop Out

|-

|-
|}

Round 3

|-

|-
|}

Round 4

|-

|-
|}

Quarterfinals

|-

|-
|}

Semi-finals

|-

|-
|}

Final

|-

|-
|}

References
 http://www.foxsportspulse.com/comp_info.cgi?a=ROUND&round=-1&client=0-9001-0-366089-0&pool=1

Chatham Cup
Chatham Cup
Chatham Cup
Chat